Felix Werner Wolfgang Drinkuth (born 20 October 1994) is a German footballer who plays as a right winger for VfB Lübeck.

Career
In January 2019, Drinkuth joined 2. Bundesliga club SC Paderborn from Eintracht Norderstedt, before immediately being loaned out to Sportfreunde Lotte in the 3. Liga for the remainder of the season.

Drinkuth made his professional debut for Sportfreunde Lotte in the 3. Liga on 25 January 2019, coming on as a substitute in the 85th minute for Maximilian Oesterhelweg in the 1–1 home draw against 1860 Munich.

On 26 July 2019, Drinkuth was loaned out to Hallescher FC until the end of 2019–20 season. On 24 July 2019, Drinkuth joined FSV Zwickau on a 1-year deal.

Personal life
Drinkuth's uncle, Reenald Koch, is a former professional footballer who played for FC St. Pauli and Altona 93, and is the president of Eintracht Norderstedt. Drinkuth's cousin Philipp Koch (Reenald's son) is also a footballer for Eintracht Norderstedt, where they played alongside each other from 2016 until 2019.

Honours
FC Eintracht Norderstedt 03
 Hamburg Cup: 2016–17

References

External links
 Profile at DFB.de
 Profile at kicker.de
 

1994 births
Living people
People from Henstedt-Ulzburg
Footballers from Schleswig-Holstein
German footballers
Association football wingers
FC St. Pauli II players
Eintracht Braunschweig II players
FC Eintracht Norderstedt 03 players
SC Paderborn 07 players
Sportfreunde Lotte players
Hallescher FC players
FSV Zwickau players
FC Carl Zeiss Jena players
VfB Lübeck players
3. Liga players
Regionalliga players